Carson Tinker (born November 15, 1989) is an American football long snapper for the Seattle Seahawks of the National Football League (NFL). He played college football at Alabama, where was a member of their 2009 National Championship team and played as the starting long snapper for both the 2011 and 2012 national championship teams. He was signed by the Jacksonville Jaguars as an undrafted free agent in 2013.

College career
After he was redshirted for the 2008 season, Tinker saw his first action in Alabama's game against Chattanooga during the 2009 season. For the 2010 season, Tinker was elevated as the starting long snapper for the Crimson Tide and converted 121 of 123 snapping opportunities during the season. For the 2011 season, Tinker converted all 119 snapping opportunities en route to the 2011 national championship. Tinker was selected by his teammates to accept the 2011 Disney's Wide World of Sports Spirit Award on December 8, 2011, on behalf of the entire team in recognition for their collective efforts in the rebuilding of Tuscaloosa after the tornado.

For his first four years with the Crimson Tide, Tinker played as a member of the team as a walk-on. Prior to the start of his senior season, Tinker was awarded a full athletic scholarship for the year by Nick Saban in recognition of his accomplishments on and off the field. In 2012, Tinker again served as the starting long snapper and converted 133 of 135 snapping opportunities during the season.

Professional career
At the end of his senior season at Alabama, Tinker was ranked as the top available long snapper for the 2013 NFL Draft.

Jacksonville Jaguars
After going undrafted in the 2013 NFL Draft, Tinker signed with the Jacksonville Jaguars. In training camp, he competed for the starting long snapper position with veteran Jeremy Cain and rookie Luke Ingram. On August 25, Tinker won the starting job after Cain and Ingram were released.

On August 3, 2017 during training, camp, Tinker suffered a torn ACL and was placed on injured reserve.

On October 11, 2018, Tinker was placed on injured reserve with an undisclosed knee injury.

On March 8, 2019, the Jaguars released Tinker due to salary cap space issues.

New York Giants
After sitting out the 2019 NFL season, Tinker was signed by the New York Giants on September 2, 2020. He was released on September 5, 2020 and signed to the practice squad the next day. He signed a reserve/future contract on January 4, 2021. He was released on August 24, 2021.

Tampa Bay Buccanners
On September 13, 2021, Tinker was signed by the Tampa Bay Buccaneers. He was released on November 23.

Las Vegas Raiders
On December 1, 2021, Tinker was signed by the Las Vegas Raiders. He was released on December 9 after Trent Sieg returned to the active roster from the Reserve/COVID list.

Los Angeles Rams
On December 18, 2021, Tinker was signed to the Los Angeles Rams practice squad. Tinker won his first Super Bowl ring when the Rams defeated the Cincinnati Bengals in Super Bowl LVI.

Seattle Seahawks
On September 8, 2022, Tinker signed with the practice squad of the Seattle Seahawks. He was signed to the active roster six days later.

Personal life
Tinker was born on November 15, 1989, in Decatur, Alabama. On April 27, 2011, Tinker suffered a personal tragedy when his girlfriend Ashley Harrison was killed during the 2011 Tuscaloosa – Birmingham tornado. In recognition for his efforts in helping the Tuscaloosa community rebuild in the aftermath of the tornado, Tinker was named as a finalist for the 2011 Sportsman of the Year. On May 1, 2014, Tinker published his first book, A Season to Remember: Faith in the Midst of the Storm (B&H Publishing Group, Nashville TN), which details his experience in the 2011 Tuscaloosa tornado as well as the 2011–12 University of Alabama football championship season. He has also been focused on promoting his foundation, The Be A Blessing Foundation, a tax-exempt 501(c)-3 charitable foundation created to help those who have suffered any kind of loss or hardship, to stop living in their circumstance and begin living in their vision.

References

External links
Jacksonville Jaguars bio
Alabama Crimson Tide bio

1989 births
Living people
Sportspeople from Decatur, Alabama
People from Murfreesboro, Tennessee
Players of American football from Tennessee
American football long snappers
Alabama Crimson Tide football players
Jacksonville Jaguars players
New York Giants players
Tampa Bay Buccaneers players
Las Vegas Raiders players
Los Angeles Rams players
Seattle Seahawks players